The following is a partially sorted list of people associated with Pace University, including current and former faculty members, alumni, students, and others:

Presidents of Pace

Notable faculty
 Charles A. Agemian - Professor of Business; banker; former Executive Vice-President of Chase Manhattan Bank; former Chairman and CEO of Hackensack Trust Corp. (renamed Garden State National Bank)
 Jacob M. Appel - bioethicist and euthanasia advocate (former faculty)
 Peter Fingesten - Founding chairman of the Art department 
 Ira Joe Fisher - CBS broadcaster; Student Success Coordinator at Pace University's Center for Academic Excellence in Pleasantville
 Harold Holzer - former professor of history; Senior Vice President for External Affairs, Metropolitan Museum of Art; co-chairman, United States 2009 Abraham Lincoln Bicentennial Commission, appointed by President Clinton in September 2000, and elected co-chairman in 2001
Matthew Humphreys - Actor and head of the BFA Acting for Film, Television, Voice-overs, and Commercials program (FTVC) within the Pace School of Performing Arts (PPA)
 Robert F. Kennedy, Jr. '87 - alumnus; Professor Emeritus  of Environmental Law; radio host, Ring of Fire; former New York City assistant district attorney
 William Kunstler - civil rights attorney, Associate Professor of Law (1951–1963)
 Ryan Scott Oliver - award-winning composer and professor for BFA Musical Theatre program
 Richard Ottinger - former member of the United States House of Representatives; Professor of Environmental Studies; co-director of Pace's Center for Environmental Legal Studies
 David Siegel - Lubin Adjunct Professor of Venture Capital and Entrepreneurship; CEO of Investopedia
 Valentine Rossilli Winsey - anthropologist and women's rights activist
 Rob Redding - talk host, journalist, author and artist

Notable alumni

(*did not graduate)

Arts and letters
 David Ehrenstein - journalist; film critic
 Marv Goldberg '67 - music historian in the field of rhythm & blues
 Jeff Rubens '61 - statistician; co-editor of The Bridge World

Commerce, accountancy, and business
 Philip C. Abramo - American financial fraudster, white-collar crime boss and DeCavalcante crime family Caporegime, known as "the King of Wall Street" 
 Ariane de Rothschild - on Board of Directors of Compagnie Financière Edmond de Rothschild and Banque privée Edmond de Rothschild; wife of Baron Benjamin de Rothschild
 Richard Grasso* - Chairman and CEO (1995–2003) of the New York Stock Exchange
 Herbert L. Henkel '79 - Chairman, Ingersoll-Rand Company; former President & CEO
 Kevin Huang - CEO, Pixel Interactive Media in Asia
 Jeff Jacobson '93 - Vice-President of Kodak; COO of Kodak's Graphic Communications Group; President of Kodak's Graphic Solutions & Services
 Edward D. Miller '68 - on Board of Directors, American Express Company; former President and CEO of AXA Financial, Inc.; former Senior Vice Chairman, Chase Manhattan; former President, Chemical Banking Corporation
Rosemary Vrablic, managing director and senior private banker of Deutsche Bank's US private wealth management business
 Allen Weisselberg '70, CFO of The Trump Organization
Frank A. Calderoni, Chief Executive Officer of Anaplan
Telfar Clemens, fashion designer and entrepreneur

Engineering and technology
 Rob Enderle - technical and legal analyst; founder of the Enderle Group
 Herbert L. Henkel '79 - Chairman, President and CEO, Ingersoll-Rand Company, Ltd.
 Ivan G. Seidenberg '81 - Former President and CEO of Verizon; benefactor and trustee; namesake of Pace's Seidenberg School of Computer Science & Information Systems

Entertainment
 Ailee -  Korean-American singer, based in South Korea
 Michelle Borth - actress, known for Hawaii Five-0
 Trevor Braun - actor, known for playing 11-year-old Larry in the HBO series Curb Your Enthusiasm and Yohnny in the Netflix series Dash & Lily
 Kate Bristol - voice actress
 Paul Dano - actor
 Meaghan Jarensky '04 - Miss New York USA 2005; Miss USA finalist
 Jarah Mariano - international model
Tommy Nelson* - actor; known for his role as Neil in the biopic My Friend Dahmer and Russell in The Cat and the Moon
 Vincent Pastore* - actor; best known for his role in The Sopranos as Salvatore "Big Pussy" Bonpensiero
 Alfred Preisser  - co-founder and director, with Christopher McElroen, of The Classical Theatre of Harlem
 Rachael Ray* - television celebrity chef, 30 Minute Meals
 Diana Scarwid - actress; Academy Award nominee and Emmy nominee
 Glenn Taranto - actor; known for his role as Gomez Addams in The Addams Family
 Dominique Fishback - actress and playwright
 Jesse James Keitel - actor; known for her role as Ruthie in Queer As Folk
 Rafael L. Silva - actor; known for his role as Carlos Reyes in 9-1-1: Lone Star
 Larry Saperstein - actor; known for his role as Big Red in High School Musical: The Musical: The Series
 Celia Rose Gooding* - actress; known for originating the role of Frankie Healy in Jagged Little Pill (musical)
 Jo Franco - travel show host and YouTube personality

Media and communications
 Mel Karmazin '67 - CEO, Sirius Satellite Radio; former President and CEO, CBS; former COO, Viacom
 Mary O'Grady - Editorial Board, Wall Street Journal
 Ken Rudin - NPR's Political Editor

Politics and public service
 Fr. John Corapi - television host, EWTN; Roman Catholic priest ordained by Pope John Paul II
 James E. Davis '89 - New York City Council member and community activist
 Jim Dunnigan* - military wargame designer
 Charles Dyson '30 - businessman and philanthropist; special consultant to the Secretary of War; former U.S. Air Force colonel; recipient of the Distinguished Service Medal and Order of the British Empire Commander's Badge; former Executive-Vice President, Textron; founder and former chairman of The Dyson Foundation and The Dyson Kissner-Moran Corporation (now DKM Corp); benefactor and trustee; namesake of Pace's Dyson Hall and Dyson College of Arts and Sciences
 Naomi Caplan Matusow ’79 - former New York State Assemblywoman, New York State Assembly
Roxanne Persaud - New York State Senator from the 19th district
 Philip T. Sica - former marshal of the City of New York (Mayoral Appointment by John V. Lindsay); Republican nominee, Queens Borough President
Andrea Stewart-Cousins - Temporary President and Majority Leader of the New York State Senate

Sports
 Edward W. Stack ’57 - Chairman (1977–2000) and current member, National Baseball Hall of Fame Board of Directors

Notable alumni from The Elisabeth Haub School of Law at Pace University 

 Ruth Noemí Colón - was the 66th Secretary of State of New York
 Philip Foglia – Prosecutor and Italian American civic rights activist
 Philip M. Halpern '80 - U.S. District Judge for the United States District Court for the Southern District of New York; adjunct professor at Pace Law School
 Kieran Lalor '07 - Member of the New York State Assembly
 Malachy E. Mannion '79 - United States District Judge, Middle District of Pennsylvania
 James A. Murphy III '86 - District Attorney, Saratoga County, New York
 George Oros - Chief of Staff to Westchester County Executive Robert Astorino, former Westchester County Legislator
 Richard Ottinger - Former member of the United States House of Representatives; former dean of Pace Law School and Co-director of the Center for Environmental Legal Studies
 Kash Patel - Attorney and former government official including chief of staff to Acting United States Secretary of Defense, worked at the United States National Security Council and United States House of Representatives, and previously was a federal prosecutor working on national security cases.
 David M. Rosen - Professor of Anthropology and Law
 Aravella Simotas - Member of the New York State Assembly

References

External links

Pace University
Pace University